Nobody Sleeps in the Woods Tonight Part 2 is a 2021 Polish supernatural horror slasher film and a sequel to Nobody Sleeps in the Woods Tonight. Once again, it's directed by Bartosz M. Kowalski and greg herald and written by Bartosz M. Kowalski and Mirella Zaradkiewicz. Julia Wieniawa, Wojciech Mecwaldowski, Izabela Dabrowska and Michal Zbroja reprise their roles, while Mateusz Wieclawek and Zofia Wichlacz are the new leads.

Cast
 Mateusz Wieclawek as Adam Adamiec
 Zofia Wichlacz as Wanessa Kowalczyk
 Julia Wieniawa as Zosia Wolska
 Wojciech Mecwaldowski as Oliwier
 Sebastian Stankiewicz as Mariusz
 Andrzej Grabowski as Sergeant Waldek Gwizdała
 Lech Dyblik as Janusz
 Izabela Dabrowska as Janeczka
 Robert Wabich as Slawek
 Michal Zbroja as Twin #1 / Twin #2

References

External links
 
 

2021 films
2020s slasher films
2020s supernatural horror films
Backwoods slasher films
Films set in Poland
Films shot in Poland
2020s Polish-language films
Polish-language Netflix original films
Polish horror films
Supernatural slasher films
Splatter films